Jessie Loutit (born 3 November 1988) is a Canadian rower.

Loutit competed at the 2019 Pan American Games where she won a silver medal in the coxless pairs event alongside Larissa Werbicki.

References

External links 
 

1996 births
Living people
Canadian female rowers
Rowers at the 2019 Pan American Games
Pan American Games medalists in rowing
Pan American Games silver medalists for Canada
Medalists at the 2019 Pan American Games
21st-century Canadian women